Mount Pleasant is a constituency of the National Assembly of the Parliament of Zimbabwe, centered on the Mount Pleasant suburb of Harare. Previously a white constituency in the Parliament of Rhodesia, it was abolished in 1987 along with the other white-reserved seats in Parliament. It was recreated for the 2008 elections and is currently represented by Samuel Banda of the Movement for Democratic Change Alliance.

Members

References 

 Zimbabwe Government Gazette, 12 July 1985 (elected members)

Constituencies disestablished in 1987
Constituencies established in 1970
Constituencies established in 2008
Harare Province
Parliamentary constituencies in Zimbabwe